Play Safe may refer to:
 Play Safe (1927 film), an American silent comedy film
 Play Safe (1936 film), an animated short film
 Play Safe (public information film), a 1978 British public information film